Biju Patnaik University of Technology (BPUT) is a public state university located in Rourkela, Odisha, India. It was established on 21 November 2002 and was named after Biju Patnaik, the former Chief Minister of Odisha.

History
It came into being on 21 November 2002 through the Biju Patnaik University of Technology (BPUT) Act of Government of Odisha. Its foundation stone was laid by Dr. A.P.J. Abdul Kalam, then Hon’ble President of India in 2003.

The main objective of instituting the university was to ensure a common curriculum and uniform evaluation for Engineering, Management, Pharmacy and Architecture colleges.

It started functioning in its campus at Chhend Colony in 2013. Construction of The Centre for Advance PG Studies and Student Complex was completed in 2014.

Campus 
The campus of Biju Patnaik University of Technology is located at Chhend Colony, Rourkela in Odisha with an area of 125 acres. It is about 7 km from Rourkela railway station, Odisha.

Center for Advanced Post Graduate Studies 
Center for Advanced PG Studies at BPUT facilitate postgraduate courses in engineering.
It is located in the southern part of the campus. It has 5 disciplines:

 Electrical Engineering
 Electronics and Telecommunication Engineering
 Civil Engineering
 Mechanical Engineering
 Computer Science Engineering

Organisation and administration

Governance
The day-to-day functioning of the university is headed by Vice Chancellor. Prof. Chitaranjan Tripathy is the current vice-chancellor of Biju Patnaik University of Technology.

Academics
The university and its affiliated colleges and institutions offer undergraduate and postgraduate courses and PhD in different fields like Engineering, Management, Pharmacy, Architecture, Computer Application and Science. Admission to these courses is done through Odisha Joint Entrance Examination.

Affiliated Colleges 

The university has 137 colleges, both constituent and affiliated.
Notable constituent and affiliated colleges include:

Indira Gandhi Institute of Technology, Sarang
Parala Maharaja Engineering College, Berhampur
Government College of Engineering, Keonjhar
Government College of Engineering, Kalahandi
Central Institute of Plastic Engineering and Technology, Bhubaneswar
College of IT and Management Education, Bhubaneswar
Institute of Management and Information Technology, Cuttack

See also

 List of colleges affiliated to Biju Patnaik University of Technology

References

External links
 Official website

 
Universities in Odisha
Engineering colleges in Odisha
Universities and colleges in Rourkela
Memorials to Biju Patnaik
Educational institutions established in 2002
2002 establishments in Orissa